A sacbe, plural sacbeob (Yucatec Maya: singular sakbej, plural sakbejo'ob), or "white road", is a raised paved road built by the Maya civilization of pre-Columbian Mesoamerica. Most connect temples, plazas, and groups of structures within ceremonial centers or cities, but some longer roads between cities are also known. The term "sacbe" is Yucatec Maya for "white road"; white perhaps because there is evidence that they were originally coated with limestone stucco or plaster, which was over a stone and rubble fill.

Etymology 
The word "Beh" operates as the root term for "Sacbe". It is a Mayan term for "road, pathway, or trail." Beh is spelled alternately as Be, bej, bey, be, bih, as well as "beel" in the possessive.

It has many distinctions from English concepts of roads, pathways, or trails. Beh's metaphoric meanings are just as important if not more important than its literal meaning of "road." Ethnographers working the lowlands have noted that it means "more than the road you see with your eyes." The term Beh refers to "the road of life".

In the Colonial times "Sacbe" was translated as calzada, which is Spanish for "main road/Highway." The literal translation of Sacbe is "white road." This is used to refer to Mayan large constructed roads covered in a white (Sac) surfacing.

Sacbeob today 
Many sacbeob can be seen by modern visitors to Maya sites; a prominent one is at Chichen Itza, running from the main group around El Castillo to the Sacred Cenote. Few of the longer roads still exist in their entirety. A well-known sacbe connects Uxmal with Kabah, which is marked by corbel arches at either end. The 62-mile-long (100 km) road connecting the ancient cities of Coba and Yaxuna was for decades the longest known to archaeologists. The remains of an even longer route have recently received the attention of archaeologists. This long sacbe apparently ran from the site of Ti'ho (modern Mérida, Yucatán), through such sites as Ake and Izamal, to the Caribbean Sea near modern Puerto Morelos, a total distance of some 300 km. In modern times, some of the ancient sacbeob have been used as bases or incorporated into modern highways and railway lines.

Historical use 
All sacbeob apparently had ritual or religious significance for pilgrimages. Travel writer and early Mayanist John Lloyd Stephens reported that some local Maya people in Yucatán still said a short ritual prayer when crossing a sacbe in the early 1840s, even though they had been overgrown with jungle for centuries at the time. He is said to have been pleased to have discovered evidence of large, well-constructed sacbeob, reports of which he had previously believed to be exaggerations on the part of the Spanish conquistadores.

Sacbeob had a number of practical uses in addition to any religious significance they may have had. Longer sacbeob could be used for trade and communication. The Maya did not have a beast of burden suitable for carrying goods over long distances, so it is likely that the sacbeob would have been regularly walked by traders, though the Maya are also known to have used water routes. There is a wealth of evidence of mounds, often interpreted as remains of huts or way stations for travelers, along large sacbeob. Looking at the large sacbe connecting Kabah to Uxmal, natives told John Lloyd Stephens that ancient Mayan couriers used the sacbeob to deliver messages between large cities. At Ake in the Yucatán, several sacbeob lead directly to cenotes, which serve both as important religious sites and sources of clean water.

At Coba, there are more than 50 sacbeob still visible today. Some researchers believe that some of the sacbeob were used to divide the population of about 55,000 people into at least four barrios or neighborhoods. Many smaller sacbeob fall in places around sources of water or other high-traffic areas like ceremonial or administrative centers. Two much larger sacbeob connect Coba to the smaller sites of Yaxuna, almost 100 km to the west, and Ixil, about 20 km to the southwest. Since Coba is the only major Classic Period site in a 5,000 square kilometer area around it, Yaxuna and Ixil are believed to be outposts or subsidiaries of Coba, which would have been the capital of the state in which they all resided.

Some sacbeob that have been studied in the northwest Yucatán seem to have been constructed at times of conflict, rapid population growth and migration, and they have been interpreted by some as "permanent markers attesting to the relationships between dominant centers and satellite settlements," effectively a way of signifying and maintaining political boundaries.

While the sacbeob in the Yucatán are the best known, they are documented elsewhere in the Maya area. A number of sacbeob have been found around El Mirador and Tikal in the northern Petén Basin and around Copan in the southern Guatemalan Highlands, as well as at other sites.

Cosmic and ceremonial reference 
Movement may hold a certain ceremonial and spiritual power in Maya culture. According to some Mayan beliefs some forms of illness can be diagnosed by the movement of various forces through the body and the world. Rituals, including curing the sick, pilgrimage, procession, and dedication, involve movement as a generative source of power, capable of change and influence.

The present day and colonial Maya term for the Milky Way is also Sacbe. The fulfilment of one's destiny is considered the fulfilment of their "road." Seeing that movement, roads, and the cosmos are important to Mayan mythos, the conflation of Sacbe with the Milky Way suggests a ceremonial importance of Sacbe.

References 

 Coe, William R., and Michael D. Coe. "Some New Discoveries at Coba (1949)." In The Carnegie Maya III: Carnegie Institution of Washington Notes on Middle American Archaeology and Ethnology, 1940–1957, edited by Weeks John M., 377–81. University Press of Colorado, 2011. 
 Folan, William J. "Coba, Quintana Roo, Mexico: An Analysis of a Prehispanic and Contemporary Source of Sascab." American Antiquity 43, no. 1 (1978): 79–85. doi:10.2307/279634. 
 Keller, Angela H. 2009 A Road by any other Name: Trails, Paths, and Roads in Maya Language and Thought. In Landscapes of Movement: Trails, Paths, and Roads in Anthropological Perspective. J. E. Snead, C. L. Erickson, and J. A. Darling, eds. Pp. 133–157. Philadelphia: University of Pennsylvania Museum of Archaeology and Anthropology. 
 Koch, P.O. 2013. John Lloyd Stephens and Frederick Catherwood: Pioneers of Mayan Archaeology. McFarland, Incorporated, Publishers. 
 Kurjack, Edward B., and E. Wyllys Andrews. "Early Boundary Maintenance in Northwest Yucatan, Mexico." American Antiquity 41, no. 3 (1976): 318–25. doi:10.2307/279520.
 Northrup, Cynthia Clark, Bentley, Jerry H., and Eckes, Jr, Alfred E.. 2004. Encyclopedia of World Trade: From Ancient Times to the Present. Florence: Taylor and Francis. 
 Roys, Lawrence, and Edwin M. Shook. "Preliminary Report on the Ruins of Ake, Yucatan." Memoirs of the Society for American Archaeology, no. 20 (1966): Ii-54. 
 Sharer, Robert (2001). Encyclopedia of Prehistory. Springer, Boston, MA. pp. 69–81. doi:10.1007/978-1-4615-0525-9_5.pdf. .
 Villa R., Alfonso. The Yaxuna-Cobá Causeway. Contributions to American Archaeology 2(9) (1934) :187-208. Washington, D.C.: Carnegie Institution of Washington.
 Wahl, David; Schreiner, Thomas; Byrne, Roger; Hansen, Richard (2007). "A Paleoecological Record from a Late Classic Maya Reservoir in the North Petén". Latin American Antiquity. 18 (2): 212–222. doi:10.2307/25063105.

External links 
 Causeways of Yucatan
 Reed college web site with Kabah and Labná sacbes

Maya architecture
Ancient roads and tracks